Žunje may refer to:

 Žunje (Brus), a village in Serbia
 Žunje (Knić), a village in Serbia